is a railway station on the Keio Line in Suginami, Tokyo, Japan, operated by the private railway operator Keio Corporation.

Station
The station consists of a single elevated island platform serving two tracks. There are also two outer tracks used by passing trains.

Platforms

History
Hachimanyama Station opened on 1 May 1918.

See also
 List of railway stations in Japan

References

External links

 Keio station information 

Keio Line
Stations of Keio Corporation
Railway stations in Tokyo
Railway stations in Japan opened in 1918